Belgium participated in the 2010 Summer Youth Olympics in Singapore.

The Belgian squad consisted of 52 athletes competing in 16 sports: aquatics (swimming), archery, athletics, canoeing, cycling, equestrian, gymnastics, hockey, judo, rowing, sailing, table tennis, taekwondo, tennis, triathlon and volleyball.

Medalists

Archery

Athletics

Canoeing

Cycling

Cross Country

Time Trial

BMX

Road Race

Overall

 * Received −5 for finishing road race with all three racers

Equestrian

Gymnastics

Artistic Gymnastics

Boys

Girls

Hockey

Judo

Individual

Team

Rowing

Sailing

Swimming

Boys'

Girls'

Table tennis

Taekwondo

Tennis

Triathlon

Boys'

Girls'

Mixed

Volleyball

References

External links
Competitors List: Belgium

2010 in Belgian sport
Nations at the 2010 Summer Youth Olympics
Belgium at the Youth Olympics